Glyphipterix trigonodes is a species of sedge moth in the genus Glyphipterix. It was described by Yutaka Arita in 1979. It is found on the Ryukyu Islands and in Taiwan.

The wingspan is 8–10 mm.

References

Glyphipterigidae
Moths described in 1979
Moths of Japan
Moths of Taiwan